The 2014–15 Greek Volleyleague season was the 47th season of the Greek Volleyleague, the highest tier professional volley league in Greece. The winner of the league was PAOK, which beat Olympiacos in the league's playoff's finals. It was the first championship of PAOK. The clubs M.E.N.T. and AEK Athens were relegated to the Greek A2 League. The MVP of the league was Ernardo Gómez, player of PAOK.

Teams

Regular season

Source: volleyleague.gr

Play-out

Play-off (5-8)

Play-off (1-4)

Final standings

References

External links
Greek Volleyleague, Official Page
Greek Volleyball Federation

Volleyball competitions in Greece
2014 in Greek sport
2015 in Greek sport
2014 in volleyball
2015 in volleyball